The Four Holy Cities of Judaism are the cities of Jerusalem, Hebron, Safed and Tiberias which were the four main centers of Jewish life after the Ottoman conquest of Palestine.

According to the 1906 Jewish Encyclopedia: "Since the sixteenth century the Holiness of Palestine, especially for burial, has been almost wholly transferred to four cities—Jerusalem, Hebron, Tiberias, and Safed."
 Jerusalem has been the holiest city in Judaism and the spiritual center of the Jewish people since the 10th century BC when the site was chosen during the lifetime of King David to be the location of the Holy Temple. 
 The Cave of the Patriarchs in Hebron is believed to be the burial place of the Jewish patriarchs: Abraham and Sarah, Isaac and Rebecca and Jacob and Leah. As such Hebron is the second holiest city to Jews, and is one of the four cities where Israelite biblical figures purchased land (Abraham bought a field and a cave east of Hebron from the Hittites (Genesis 23:16-18), King David bought a threshing floor at Jerusalem from the Jebusite Araunah (2 Samuel 24:24), Jacob bought land outside the walls of Shechem from the Shechemites (Genesis 33:18-19), and Omri bought the site of Samaria.) Historically, Hebron was the first capital of King David.
 Safed came to be regarded as a holy city after the influx of Jews following the expulsion of Jews from Spain in 1492 and became known as a center of kabbalistic scholarship.
 Tiberias was significant in Jewish history as the place where the Jerusalem Talmud was composed and as the home of the Masoretes, but its status as a holy city is due to the influx of rabbis who established the city as a center for Jewish learning in the 18th and 19th centuries. According to Jewish tradition, the redemption will begin in Tiberias and the Sanhedrin will be reconstituted there. In Jewish belief, the Messiah will arise from the lake of Tiberias, enter into the city, and be enthroned at Safed on the summit of a lofty hill.

See also 
 Holy of Holies
 Jerusalem in Judaism
 Laws and customs of the Land of Israel in Judaism
 Old Yishuv – the Jewish communities established in the Land of Israel before the advent of modern political Zionism
 Temple in Jerusalem

References

External links